The Smithereens is an American rock band from Carteret, New Jersey, United States. The group formed in 1980 with members Pat DiNizio (vocals & guitar), Jim Babjak (guitar & vocals), Mike Mesaros (bass guitar & vocals), and Dennis Diken (drums & percussion). This original lineup continued until 2006, when Mesaros left the band and Severo Jornacion took over on bass guitar until Mesaros' return in 2016. After DiNizio died in 2017, the band continued performing live shows as a trio (Babjak, Mesaros and Diken) with various guest vocalists.

The band are perhaps best known for a string of hits in the late 1980s through the mid-1990s, including "Only a Memory", "A Girl Like You" and "Too Much Passion". The Smithereens have collaborated with numerous musicians, both in the studio (Belinda Carlisle, Julian Lennon, Lou Reed, Suzanne Vega) and live (Graham Parker and The Kinks). The band's name comes from a Yosemite Sam catchphrase, "Varmint, I'm a-gonna blow you to smithereens!"

History

Babjak, Diken, and Mesaros are all from Carteret, New Jersey and graduated from Carteret High School in 1975. In 1980, they formed the band with DiNizio, who was from Scotch Plains, New Jersey. DiNizio had placed a classified ad in The Aquarian Weekly looking for a drummer to help on a demo tape – Diken answered it, and later introduced his schoolmates Babjak and Mesaros as well.

The band's name derives from the cartoon character Yosemite Sam who had the expression, "Ya better say your prayers, ya flea-bitten varmint … I’m-a-gonna blow ya to smithereens!". The Smithereens are known for writing and playing catchy 1960s-influenced power pop. The group gained publicity when the single "Blood and Roses" from its first album was included on the soundtrack for Dangerously Close, and the music video got moderate rotation on MTV. "Blood and Roses" was also featured on the 1980s TV show Miami Vice during the episode 'The Savage' (first aired February 6, 1987).

Along with a basic East coast roots-rock sound that owed much to musicians who inspired DiNizio, including the Who, the Clash, Elvis Costello, and Nick Lowe, The Smithereens deployed a uniquely retro obsession with Mod, the late British Invasion pop of John's Children and the Move, and other artifacts of 1950s and 1960s culture that lent its music substance. DiNizio said his single biggest influence was Buddy Holly: "Listening to Buddy Holly, I rediscovered my enjoyment of simple pop structures and pretty melodies....I've always thought of him as a kindred spirit." Likewise, The Who and The Kinks were major influences on Babjak and Diken.

The title and lyrics of their song, "In a Lonely Place," appear to be based on the 1950 Humphrey Bogart film of the same title because of Bogart's lines: "I was born the day I met you, lived a while when you loved me, died a little when we broke apart." The title and artwork for the album 11 were a nod to the original 1960 Ocean's 11 film.

The Smithereens starred as themselves and were featured as the entertainment in the indoor beach party scene of the 1986 Troma film Class of Nuke 'Em High, playing the song "Much Too Much". The soundtrack to the film was not released until 2014.

The highest position a Smithereens album attained on the Billboard pop charts was in 1990, when 11 peaked at No. 41 on the strength of the single "A Girl Like You" (which hit No. 38). "A Girl Like You" was originally written to be the title track for the 1989 Cameron Crowe film Say Anything.... The album also featured a duet between DiNizio and Belinda Carlisle on Blue Period.

The basic tracks for their most recent studio album of original material, titled 2011, were recorded in early October 2010 and the album was released on April 5, 2011.

The Smithereens were the final band to perform at the fabled Bleecker Street nightclub Kenny's Castaways in Greenwich Village, New York City, in October 2012.

In June 2013, The Smithereens toured as support for Tom Petty and the Heartbreakers.

Original bass player Mike Mesaros reunited with the band in 2016 and 2017 for select performances and continued to tour in 2018 through the present.

DiNizio died in Scotch Plains, New Jersey, on December 12, 2017, at the age of 62. According to bandmates, his health declined following a series of issues that began in 2015, resulting in nerve damage that limited the use of his right hand and arm.

The surviving members of the band, including Mesaros, performed together as The Smithereens in a tribute show to DiNizio on January 13, 2018, at the Count Basie Theatre in Red Bank, NJ. In a five-hour concert, the band was joined by Steven Van Zandt, Dave Davies, Ted Leo, Robin Wilson, Lenny Kaye, Southside Johnny, Marshall Crenshaw, Bebe Buell, Richard Barone, Tony Shanahan, Graham Maby, Freedy Johnston, Kenny Howes, John Jorgenson, Peter Zaremba, Keith Streng, producer Ed Stasium, Andy Burton, and various other musicians. The Pat DiNizio Musical Performance Scholarship was established at the Count Basie's Performing Arts Academy.

In 2018, Babjak, Diken and Mesaros decided to continue the band's musical legacy and tour with different guest vocalists, including Marshall Crenshaw and Robin Wilson of the Gin Blossoms, separately taking over lead vocal duties at concerts throughout the United States, including shows in NYC, Chicago, Massachusetts, Colorado, and Virginia.

On May 25, 2018, the band released Covers on Sunset Blvd. Records, featuring 22 of the band's favorite songs first recorded by other artists. The CD includes rarities from the vault and some previously unreleased tracks.

On November 16, 2018, The Smithereens were nominated for induction into the New Jersey Hall of Fame, Performing Arts Category, Class of 2018.

2022 marks The Smithereens' 42nd continuous year as a band.

In July 2020, the band released a 7-inch vinyl single of their cover of the Beatles' 1962 single "Love Me Do" and its B-side "P.S. I Love You". "Love Me Do" was originally recorded in 2008 during sessions for B-Sides The Beatles but was not considered for inclusion on the album. Both tracks feature session drummer Andy White, who originally performed on the Beatles versions. Mike Mesaros added new bass parts to both tracks and Kristin Pinell of the Grip Weeds guests on melodica.

In September 2022, The Smithereens released The Lost Album.  It was originally recorded in 1993 between their recording contracts with Capitol and RCA.  Eleven of the songs on The Lost Album (minus the Babjak-penned "I'm Sexy") previously appeared on DiNizio's 1995 Song Demos release (MCA Publishing). Selected songs were also previously included on DiNizio's Songs and Sounds (1997), Pat DiNizio (2005), and The Best of Pat Dinizio (2015).

Members

 Jim Babjak - lead guitar, backing vocals (1980–present)
Dennis Diken - drums, percussion, backing vocals (1980–present)
Mike Mesaros (born December 11, 1957) - bass guitar, backing vocals (1980-2006, 2016, 2017–present)

Former members
 Pat DiNizio - lead vocals, rhythm guitar (1980-2017, deceased)
 Severo "The Thrilla" Jornacion - bass guitar, backing vocals (2006-2016, touring substitute 2017–present)

Discography

Studio albums
Especially for You, 1986 (Enigma, Capitol) US #51, UK INDIE #5
Green Thoughts, 1988 (Enigma, Capitol) US #60, UK INDIE #7
11, 1989 (Enigma, Capitol) US #41
Blow Up, 1991 (Capitol)  US #120
A Date with The Smithereens, 1994 (RCA, BMG) US #133
God Save The Smithereens, 1999 (Velvel, Koch)
Meet The Smithereens!, 2007 (Koch) 
Christmas with The Smithereens, 2007 (Koch) 
B-Sides The Beatles, 2008 (Koch) 
The Smithereens Play Tommy, 2009 (eOne Music)
2011, 2011 (eOne Music)
The Lost Album, 2022 (Sunset Blvd Records) - recorded in 1993

Extended plays
Girls About Town, 1980 (D-Tone Records)
Beauty and Sadness, 1983 (Little Ricky Records, Enigma, Capitol)

Live albums
Live, 1988 (Restless)
Instant Live: Music Midtown Festival Atlanta, GA 5/1/04, 2005 (Instant Live Recordings)
Extended Versions, 2006 (Sony BMG)
Live in Concert! Greatest Hits and More, 2008 (Koch)
 The Smithereens Play The Beatles Washington, D.C. February 11, 1964 Concert, 2014 (Not on Label)

Compilations
Blown to Smithereens: Best of The Smithereens, 1995 (Capitol)
Attack of The Smithereens, 1995 (Capitol)
The Best of The Smithereens, 1997 (EMI, Capitol)
From Jersey It Came! The Smithereens Anthology, 2004 (Capitol)
 Greatest Hits...Revisited, 2010 (Not on Label)
 Especially for You - 30th Anniversary, 2016 (Not on Label)
 Covers, 2018 (Sunset Blvd Records)

Soundtracks and other appearances
 The East Coast 60's Rock & Roll Experiment, 1986 (Performance) – "Hang 'Em High (Hang Ten High)" 
 Dangerously Close (Original Motion Picture Soundtrack), 1986 (Enigma) – "Blood and Roses", "Some Other Guy"
 Burglar (Original Motion Picture Soundtrack), 1987 (MCA) – "Some Other Guy"
 I Was a Teenage Zombie (Original Motion Picture Soundtrack), 1987 (Capitol) – "Time and Time Again"
 Under the Boardwalk (Original Motion Picture Soundtrack), 1988 (Enigma) – "Blood and Roses"
 Encino Man (Original Motion Picture Soundtrack), 1992 (Hollywood) – "Wooly Bully"
 Timecop (Original Motion Picture Soundtrack), 1994 (RCA) – "Time Won't Let Me" (not included on soundtrack album)
 Fast Track to Nowhere: Songs from the Showtime Original Series Rebel Highway, 1994 (A&M) – "The Stroll"
 Brace Yourself! A Tribute to Otis Blackwell, 1994 (Shanachie) – "Let's Talk About Us"
 Resurrection of the Warlock - A Tribute to Marc Bolan & T-Rex, 1995 (The Old School Records) – "The Slider"
 Classic Rockin' Christmas, 1993 (Koch) – "Rudolph, The Red-Nosed Reindeer"
 One Step Up / Two Steps Back: The Songs of Bruce Springsteen, 1997 (The Right Stuff) – "Downbound Train" 
 Romy and Michele's High School Reunion (Original Motion Picture Soundtrack), 1997 (Hollywood) – "Blood and Roses"
 Boys Don't Cry (Original Motion Picture Soundtrack), 1999 (Koch) – "She's Got a Way"
 Burnzy's Last Call (Original Motion Picture Soundtrack), 1999 (Ripe & Ready/Cellsum Records) – "I Don't Want to Look Into the Mirror"
 A Tribute to the King, 2002 (Capitol) – "Don't Be Cruel (Live)" 
 Songs from the Material World: A Tribute to George Harrison, 2003 (Koch) – "I Want To Tell You" 
 Harold & Kumar Go to White Castle (Original Motion Picture Soundtrack), 2004 (Razor & Tie) – "White Castle Blues"
 Rockin' Christmas, 2005 (Sony BMG) – "Waking Up on Christmas Morning" 
 The Sandinista! Project - A Tribute to the Clash, 2007 (00:02:59 Records) – "Up in Heaven (Not Only Here)" 
 Class of Nuke 'Em High (Original Motion Picture Soundtrack), 2014 (Ship to Shore PhonoCo.) – "Much Too Much"

Singles

Music Videos

Videography 
Smithereens 10, 1991

References

External links

 

 
 

1980 establishments in New Jersey
Alternative rock groups from New Jersey
American power pop groups
Capitol Records artists
MNRK Music Group artists
Jersey Shore musical groups
Musical groups established in 1980
Musical groups from New Jersey
Musical quartets
RCA Records artists
College rock musical groups
American hard rock musical groups